Iveta Apkalna (born 30 November 1976, Rēzekne, Latvia) is a Latvian organist and pianist.

Biography 
Iveta Apkalna studied piano and organ at the Jāzeps Vītols Latvian Academy of Music, graduating in both instruments with distinction in 1999. In 1999/2000 she continued piano studies at the London Guildhall School of Music and Drama.
In 2003 she completed a three-year-long study in the organ soloist class of Ludger Lohmann at the State University of Music and Performing Arts Stuttgart, Germany. She has given concerts in the biggest and most famous churches and cathedrals of Europe and North America, taken part in the leading organ festivals and received numerous prizes in organ competitions. She regularly performs organ recitals at the Riga Cathedral. Her repertoire consists of organ music from J.S.Bach to contemporary composers thereby bringing it beyond the borders of church walls. In 1993 she was the official organist in service at Aglona basilica (Latvia) during the visit of Pope John Paul II. Since its opening in 2016, she has served as the principal organist of the Elbphilharmonie.

Awards 
 2002 – winner of European Selection Round of the Royal Bank Calgary International Organ Competition in London.
 2002 – J.S.Bach prize at the World Competition of the Royal Bank Calgary International Organ Competition, (Canada).
 2003 – winner of the 3rd Mikael Tariverdiev Organ Competition in Kaliningrad, Russia
 2003, 2017 – Great Latvian Music Award
 2005 – "ECHO-Klassik" prize in the category "Instrumentalist of the Year" for CD "Himmel & Hölle"

Discography 
 2003 – Iveta Apkalna Live (edition Hera)
 2004 – Touch down in Riga (edition Querstand)
 2004 – Himmel & Hölle (edition Hera)
 2006 – Prima Volta (edition Ifo)
 2007 – Noema – David Orlowsky Klezmorim (edition Sony)
 2008 – Trumpet and Organ (edition Phoenix)
 2009 – The New Organ of the Philharmonie Mercatorhalle Duisburg (edition Acousence Classics)
 2011 – L'Amour et la Mort (edition Oehms Classics)
 2012 – Walter Braunfels (1882–1954): Konzert für Orgel, Knabenchor & Orchester op.38 (edition Oehms Classics)
 2012 – Leoš Janáček (1854–1928): Missa Glagolytica (edition Pentatone)
 2013 – Mariss Jansons conducts Brahms and Janacek (edition Arthaus)
 2015 – Iveta Apkalna – Bach & Glass (edition Oehms Classic)
 2018 – Light & Dark, First Solo Organ Recording from the Elbphilharmonie Hamburg (Berlin Classics)
 2018 – Widmann: Arche, Marlis Petersen, Thomas E. Bauer, Iveta Apkalna, Kent Nagano, Philharmonisches Staatsorchester Hamburg (ECM)

References

External links 
 Official Website
 OMM – Iveta Apkalna (German)
 Dance with the Queen – Iveta Apkalna plays the Organ – video
 Organ Arrival concert in Rezekne

1976 births
Living people
Women organists
People from Rēzekne
Latvian classical organists
State University of Music and Performing Arts Stuttgart alumni
Latvian expatriates in Germany
21st-century organists
21st-century classical musicians
21st-century women musicians
Alumni of the Guildhall School of Music and Drama